Jack Thomson may refer to:

Jack Thomson (footballer) (born 1929), Australian rules footballer
Jack Thomson (politician) (1907–1997), Australian politician

See also
Jack Thompson (disambiguation)
John Thompson (disambiguation)
John Thomson (disambiguation)